Lubenkino is a rural locality (a village) in Penkinskoye Rural Settlement, Kameshkovsky District, Vladimir Oblast, Russia. The population was 2 as of 2010.

Geography 
Lubenkino is located 34 km south of Kameshkovo (the district's administrative centre) by road. Pirogovo is the nearest rural locality.

References 

Rural localities in Kameshkovsky District